Menetia greyii, commonly known as the common dwarf skink or Grey's skink, is a species of lizard in the family Scincidae. The species is endemic to mainland Australia and Indonesia.

Etymology
The specific name, greyii, is in honour of explorer George Grey, who became Governor of South Australia and later Governor of New Zealand. George Grey was born on the 14th of April 1812 in Portuguese city, Lisbon. He was inspired by Charles Sturt's discoveries in Australia and in 1836 he left to attempt to establish a settlement in Australia's north-west. He was knighted in 1848. After many accomplishments in Australia, New Zealand and South Africa, Sir George Grey returned to London in 1894 and died in 1898.

Geographic range
One of Australia's most widespread and abundant lizards. The common dwarf skink is found across Australia. It is found west of the Great Dividing Range. It is not recorded to occur in north-east Northern Territory, Cape York Peninsula, southern Victoria or Tasmania, but it is known to occur in all other areas of Australia. The range of the common dwarf skink spans across approximately 93% of the continent. A continuous occurrence record map can be found online at "Atlas of living Australia" through this reference link.

Habitat
M. greyii are widespread and found in many different habitats. It is found in heaths, deserts, woodlands and grasslands. It is also frequently found in urban environments, and is therefore fairly well known. These skinks are known to shelter underneath logs and rocks. They are often found moving through leaf litter on the ground while searching for their main food source of invertebrates. It is widespread on a variety of soil types.

Description
M. greyii is a very small skink that grows up to 38-40mm, the body is of light build and elongated. It has smooth scales and four limbs, the forelimbs have four digits and the hindlimbs have five digits. It is brownish grey to grey and has dorsal dashes that can form broken lines and broad dark upper lateral and white midlateral stripes. The underbelly of the skink is usually white. Breeding males can be distinguished as they have a yellow/orange flush on the underbelly as well as a pink flush on the throat. Some populations can differ slightly in colour because of the different environments they inhabit. The common dwarf skink has two supraciliary scales, the first is quite small and the second is contacting the supraocular scale. It has 3 scales in a line between the eye and the nostril.

The common dwarf skink is fossorial, meaning it is a burrowing skink. This species is diurnal.

Prey for the common dwarf skink includes insects. Predators of the common dwarf skink include, but not limited to, larger reptiles, avian species and cats.

Reproduction
Common dwarf skinks lay 1-3 eggs in every clutch.

M. greyii is one of a small number of vertebrate species that are known to reproduce by parthenogenesis. A 2007 study discovered that Menetia greyii skinks are able to reproduce by parthenogenesis as well as by sexual reproduction. Mitochondrial DNA revealed that parthenogenesis is able to occur in this species. Parthenogenesis is when eggs can mature without being fertilised into clones of the female. This process can occur in some non-mammal species.

References

Further reading
Gray, John Edward (1845). Catalogue of the Specimens of Lizards in the Collection of the British Museum. London: Trustees of the British Museum. (Edward Newman, printer). xxviii + 289 pp. (Menetia greyii, new species, p. 66).

Menetia
Reptiles of Western Australia
Vertebrate parthenogenesis
Reptiles described in 1845
Skinks of Australia
Taxa named by John Edward Gray